The theory of Kashmiri descent from the lost tribes of Israel posits that the Kashmiri people originally descended from the Ten Lost Tribes.

History
The connection between Jews and Kashmir was suggested by Al-Birun, the famous 11th-century Persian Muslim scholar. According to his famed chronicle on his journeys through South Asia, Kashmir lies on a plateau surrounded by high inaccessible mountains. The south and east of the country belong to the Hindus, the west to various kings, the Bolar-Shah and the Shugnan-Shah, and the more remote parts up to the frontiers of Badhakhshan, to the WakhanShah. . . The inhabitants of Kashmir . . . are particularly anxious about the natural strength of their country, and therefore take always much care to keep a strong hold upon the entrances and roads leading into it. In consequence it is difficult to have any commerce with them. In former times they used to allow one or two foreigners to enter their country, particularly Jews, but at present time they do not allow any Hindu who they do not know personally to enter, much less other people.François Bernier, a 17th-century French physician and Sir Francis Younghusband, who explored this region in the 1800s, commented on the similar physiognomy between Kashmiris and Jews, including "fair skin, prominent noses," and similar head shapes.

In 1899 Mirza Ghulam Ahmad, founder of the Ahmadiyya movement, advanced the theory that Jesus had survived the crucifixion and traveled to Kashmir to find and preach to the lost tribes of Israel. Ahmad claimed that Jesus lived in Kashmir, had children, died at the age of 120, and was buried in Srinagar.

Baikunth Nath Sharga argues that, despite the etymological similarities between Kashmiri and Jewish surnames, the Kashmiri Pandits are of Indo-Aryan descent while the Jews are of Semitic descent.

Basis in tribal names and toponymy
The theory is essentially based on the purported similarities between Kashmir place names and Hebrew words and phrases. The name Kashmir locally known as kasher itself is said to be based on the Hebrew word Kashir, "like Syria". The Kashmir valley, said to be the dwelling place of the Ten Lost Tribes, is called Bagh-I-Suleman (Garden of Solomon) in local parlance. The connection between Kashmir and ancient Israel is strengthened further by such Kashmiri place names as "Tomb of Moses" and "Throne of Solomon". There is also a Kashmiri tradition that the 40 years of wandering in the desert actually covered the ground from Asia to Kashmir, and that Kashmir is in fact the Promised Land.

The names of approximately 350 towns and villages in Kashmir bear some resemblance to place names in the Holy Land. These include:
Bandpoor (similar to Beth Peor)
Naboo Hill (similar to Mount Nebo)
Pishgah (similar to Mount Pisgah)
Mamre (similar to Mamre)

Genetics
Using genome-wide genotyping and admixture detection methods, it was determined there are no significant or substantial signs of Jewish admixture, among 16 Sephardi and/or Ashkenazi Jewish populations surveyed, in modern-day Kashmiris.  This does not rule out the possibility of Mizrahi Jewish admixture, which was not studied.

See also
 Japanese-Jewish common ancestry theory
 Khazar hypothesis of Ashkenazi ancestry
 Theories of Pashtun origin

References

Israelite
Kashmiri